Ettaler Manndl is a 1636-meter-high mountain of the Ammergau Alps in Bavaria, Germany. It is close to the town of Oberammergau, above of Ettal and about 10 km north of Garmisch-Partenkirchen. It is a sub-peak of the Laber mountain at 1681 m.

The mountain is a popular destination for hiking and in Winter, skiing is also possible. A cable car (the Laberbergbahn) brings visitors up to just below the summit of the Laber, from where a variety of footpaths lead. There is also a restaurant at the top cable car station.

External links 

 Panoramic photo from the summit
 Tourist information 
 Sketch plan of the mountain including cable car
 Laberbahn
 Kloster Ettal 

Mountains of Bavaria
Ammergau Alps
Mountains of the Alps